Football Club Platinum is a professional football club in Zvishavane, Midlands Province, that competes in the Zimbabwe Premier Soccer League, founded in 1995.

In 2010, the club was known as Mimosa Football Club. and in January 2011, changed its name to FC Platinum.

Honours
Castle Lager Premier League
Champions (4): 2017, 2018, 2019, 2021–2022
Chibuku Super Cup
Champions (1): 2020–21

Performance in CAF competitions
CAF Champions League: 6 appearances
2012 – First round
2018 – Preliminary Round
2019 – Group Stage
2020 – Group Stage
2021 – First Round
2022 - First Round

CAF Confederation Cup: 2 appearances
2015 – First round
2021 – Play Off Round ( In Progress )

CAF Super Cup: 0 appearance

References

External links
Official website

Platinum
Platinum
Platinum